Buccinum ciliatum is a species of sea snail, a marine gastropod mollusk in the family Buccinidae, the true whelks.

Subspecies
 Buccinum ciliatum ciliatum Fabricius, 1780
 Buccinum ciliatum sericatum Hancock, 1846 (synonym : Buccinum sericatum Hancock, 1846)

Description
The maximum shell size is 32 mm.

Distribution
This species is distributed in the cold waters around the Arctic, the North West Atlantic Ocean, Greenland, Canada and the Gulf of Maine.

References

External links
 

Buccinidae
Gastropods described in 1780